Lewis Rupp (May 11, 1858 – January 23, 1946; first name often misspelled Louis) was a member of the Wisconsin State Assembly.

Biography
Rupp was born on May 11, 1858, in Fond du Lac County, Wisconsin. Later, he moved to Calumet County, Wisconsin.

Career
Rupp was elected to the Assembly in 1902. Previously, he served as Chairman of the Calumet County Board and a town supervisor and chairman. He was a Democrat.

References

External links

The Political Graveyard

People from Fond du Lac County, Wisconsin
People from Calumet County, Wisconsin
County supervisors in Wisconsin
Democratic Party members of the Wisconsin State Assembly
1858 births
1946 deaths
Burials in Wisconsin